Hayden Smith (born 28 March 1992) is an Australian bobsledder. He competed in the four-man event at the 2018 Winter Olympics.

References

External links
 

1992 births
Living people
Australian male bobsledders
Olympic bobsledders of Australia
Bobsledders at the 2018 Winter Olympics
Place of birth missing (living people)